Wray Downes (January 14, 1931 – March 19, 2020) was a Canadian jazz pianist.

Downes was born in Toronto. He was classically trained, having studied at Trinity College, London, but began playing jazz in 1952 as a student at the Paris Conservatoire. While in France, he played with Sidney Bechet and Bill Coleman. After returning to Canada in the middle of the decade, he played with Oscar Peterson and was a recurring house pianist at the Town Tavern in Toronto, playing with Roy Eldridge, Coleman Hawkins, Clark Terry, and Lester Young. He played for many years with Peter Appleyard and Dave Young, and also worked with Archie Alleyne, Pete Magadini, Buddy Tate, and Dave Turner. He died on March 19, 2020, in Montreal.

References

Mark Miller, "Wray Downes". The New Grove Dictionary of Jazz. 2nd edition, ed. Barry Kernfeld.

External links
 

1931 births
2020 deaths
Canadian jazz pianists
Musicians from Toronto
21st-century Canadian pianists
Black Canadian musicians
Justin Time Records artists